There are several places in the U.S. state of Ohio named Pekin, including:

 Pekin, Carroll County, Ohio
 Pekin, Warren County, Ohio